Munster High School (MHS) is a public high school in Munster, Indiana. It is part of the School Town of Munster. Munster High School serves as the only high school for the Munster School District.

Demographics
The demographic breakdown of the 1,515 students enrolled in 2019-20 was:
Male - 50%
Female - 50%
Native American/Alaskan - 0%
Asian/Pacific islanders - 6%
Black - 8%
Hispanic - 23%
White - 58%
Multiracial - 4%

15% of the students were eligible for free or reduced-price lunch.

Athletics
The following sports are offered at Munster High School:

Baseball (boys)
State champ 2002
Basketball (girls & boys)
Cross Country (girls & boys)
Football (boys)
Golf (girls & boys)
Soccer (girls & boys)
Softball (girls)
Swimming and Diving (girls & boys)
Boys state champs 1973–1977, 1979, 1980
Girls state champs 1976-1978
Tennis (girls & boys)
Track and Field (girls & boys)
Volleyball (girls)
Wrestling (boys)

Notable alumni
Nzinga Blake - Actress
Stephan Bonnar - Retired Professional Mixed Martial Artist, most notably with the UFC
William C. Bradford - Professor of political science and law, Attorney General Chiricahua Apache Nation 
James Hamblin (journalist) - Journalist and doctor.
Nan Hayworth - Former U.S. Representative for New York's 19th congressional district
Sue Hendrickson - Paleontologist responsible for discovery of the largest specimen of a T. rex found and one of the most complete skeletons recorded 
Joe Mansueto - Founder, majority owner and CEO of Morningstar, Inc.
Ryan McMahen - Former MLS for the Kansas City Wizards, as well as various developmental league teams including the Michigan Bucks and Austin Aztex
Hal Morris - Former MLB first baseman for the Detroit Tigers, Cincinnati Reds, Kansas City Royals and New York Yankees
Mike Pellicciotti - American politician and Washington State Treasurer
Jill Underly - American Educator and Wisconsin State Superintendent of Public Instruction
Todd Rokita - Former Secretary of State of Indiana, former member of the U.S. House of Representatives from Indiana's 4th congressional district, and Indiana Attorney General

See also
 List of high schools in Indiana

References

External links
 Munster High School website
 School Town of Munster website
 Munster High School statistics at DOE Mustang

Public high schools in Indiana
Educational institutions established in 1967
Schools in Lake County, Indiana
1967 establishments in Indiana